Aseem Goel is an Indian politician. He was elected to the Haryana Legislative Assembly from Ambala city (Vidhan Sabha constituency) in the 2014 and 2019 Haryana Legislative Assembly election as a member of the Bharatiya Janata Party.

View of India 
Goel took an oath to make India a ‘Hindu Rashtra’ and that he is “ready to make or take sacrifice for it” at an event organized by Samajik Chetna Sangathan on Uniform Civil Code at Aggarwal Dharamshala in Ambala city.  He justified the move claiming that everyone who lives in India is a Hindu.

References 

1979 births
Living people
Bharatiya Janata Party politicians from Haryana
People from Ambala
Haryana MLAs 2019–2024
Haryana MLAs 2014–2019